Adobe Character Animator is a desktop application software product that combines real-time live motion-capture with a multi-track recording system to control layered 2D puppets based on an illustration drawn in Photoshop or Illustrator. It is automatically installed with Adobe After Effects CC 2015 to 2017 and is also available as a standalone application which one can download separately as part of a Creative Cloud all-apps subscription. It is used to generate real-time 2D animations to produce both live and non-live animation.

Description 
Character Animator imports layered Adobe Photoshop and Adobe Illustrator documents into puppets which have behaviors applied to them. The puppets are then placed into a scene, which can be viewed in the Scene panel and Timeline panel. Rigging is set up in the Puppet panel, though basic rigging is fully automatic based on specific layer names like Right Eyebrow and Smile. Properties of selected elements can be examined and changed in the Properties panel, including behavior parameters. Live inputs include a webcam (for face-tracking), microphone (for live lip sync), keyboard (for triggering layers to hide/show), and mouse (for warping specific handles).

Final output of a scene can be exported to a sequence of PNG files and a WAV file, or any video format supported by Adobe Media Encoder. Live output can be sent to other applications running on the same machine via the Syphon protocol (Mac only) or Adobe Mercury Transmit on both Mac and Windows. Scenes can also be dropped directly into After Effects and Premiere Pro, using Dynamic Link to avoid rendering.

History 
Character Animator was originally code-named "Animal".

The following is the list of versions of Character Animator.

See also 
Aniforms
Adobe After Effects
Adobe Animate (formerly Macromedia Flash)

References

External links 

 

Character Animator
Character Animator
2015 software
2D animation software
Animation software
Motion capture